Tiago Jonas Ferraz Rodrigues (born 1 December 1983), known as Jonas, is a Portuguese former footballer who played as a central defender.

Club career
Jonas was born in Porto. In his country, he never competed in higher than the third division. On 15 June 2005, the free agent joined Scottish Premier League side Falkirk alongside compatriot Vítor Lima, being discovered by the club's player-coach Russell Latapy who had spent several seasons in Portugal as a player. He made his official debut on 6 August, playing the full 90 minutes in a 2–0 away win against Livingston.

On 29 May 2006, Jonas was awarded a new one-year contract with the Bairns, having appeared in 37 competitive games in his first season. He would never appear, however, for the first team again, leaving in December 2007 and returning to Portugal.

References

External links

1983 births
Living people
Portuguese footballers
Footballers from Porto
Association football defenders
Segunda Divisão players
F.C. Infesta players
C.D. Cinfães players
Académico de Viseu F.C. players
Scottish Premier League players
Falkirk F.C. players
Portuguese expatriate footballers
Expatriate footballers in Scotland
Portuguese expatriate sportspeople in Scotland